Mackin is a feature on Earth's Moon, a crater in Taurus–Littrow valley.  Astronauts Eugene Cernan and Harrison Schmitt landed north of it in 1972, on the Apollo 17 mission, but did not visit it.

Mackin is adjacent to the similarly sized crater Hess.  To the north is Camelot, to the northwest are Shorty and Lara, and to the west is Nansen.  To the northeast is Emory.

The crater was named by the astronauts after geologist Joseph Hoover Mackin.

References

External links
43D1S2(25) Apollo 17 Traverses at Lunar and Planetary Institute
Geological Investigation of the Taurus–Littrow Valley: Apollo 17 Landing Site

Impact craters on the Moon
Apollo 17